The Wittenburgervaart is a short canal in Amsterdam, between the Oostelijke Eilanden (Eastern Islands).

Description
 
The canal separates the island of Wittenburg, built in the 17th century, from the former islands of Oostenburg and Oostenburgereiland. 
The Wittenburgervaart runs parallel to the Kattenburgervaart (to the west) from the Nieuwe Vaart to the end of the Dijksgracht. 
On the south side, the Oostenburgerdwarsvaart, which separates Oostenburg from Oostenburgereiland, leads to the Oostenburgervaart canal.

Two bridges cross the canal:
The historical Oesjesduiker (bridge number 114) at the Nieuwe Vaart, between the Wittenburgergracht and Oostenburgergracht streets that form part of the so-called Eilandboulevard. This is a low fixed bridge, where all small boats can sail underneath.
The Ezelsbrug (no. 1904), a drawbridge built in the last part of the 20th century for pedestrians and bicycles, between Wittenburg and Oostenburg.
On the north side on the banks of Wittenburg at the Fortuinstraat is a marina of the water sports clubs Albatros and De Oostvaarders. 
In addition, there are a few houseboats on the Windrooskade.

In 2012, the artwork Tire Boat (1972) by Robert Jasper Grootveld, was placed on stilts in the water on the south side at the Oostenburgerdwarsstraat next to the Ezelsbrug.

See also 
Canals of Amsterdam

Notes

Sources

Canals in Amsterdam